The Man from Kathmandu is the first English language Nepalese film directed and written by Pema Dhondup. The film is Dhondup's second feature film and features Gulshan Grover, Hameed Sheikh, Jose Manuel, Anna Sharma, Michael Brian, Karma Shakya, Neer Shah, Mithila Sharma.  The film also brings in new talent from the industry including the cast. The film trailer is receiving  highly positive reviews for its story as it shows religious unity and speaks against radicalism.

Cast 
 Jose Manuel as Faisal Mustafa
 Gulshan Grover as Abu Mia Siddiqi
 Hameed Sheikh as Pundit Harvashdam
 Anna Sharma as Namrata
 Karma Shakya as Sher Thapa
 Neer Shah as Suresh Bhandari
 Shisheer Bangdel as Praveen Kumar
 Mithila Sharma as Renu Bhandari
 Paramita RL Rana as Sujata
 Abhisek Baniya "Nasty" as himself (Special appearance for song Kathmandu's finest)
 Yama Buddha as himself (Special appearance for song Kathmandu's finest)

Soundtrack

References

2019 films
Films set in Nepal
Nepalese drama films
2010s Nepali-language films
Films set in Los Angeles
Films directed by Pema Dhondup
2010s English-language films